MMHSS Thalassery (Al-Madrasathul Mubaracka Higher Secondary School) is a high school in Thalassery, Kannur district, Kerala.

History

The school began in 1928 as a madrasa.  The building was inaugurated by Moulana Shoukath Ali on 30 April 1934.  In 1936 the institution began functioning as a lower primary school and later as an upper primary school.  It now educates students up to Plus 2.

References

Educational institutions established in 1928
High schools and secondary schools in Kerala
Schools in Kannur district
1928 establishments in India
Education in Thalassery